Daptocephalus is an extinct genus of non-mammalian synapsid anomodont dicynodont, it which was found in Late Permian strata, in a biozone known precisely for the presence of fossils of this dicynodont, the Daptocephalus Zone, in the Karoo Basin in South Africa. An additional species, D. huenei, is known from the Usili Formation in Tanzania and was formerly assigned to the genus Dicynodon before a study in 2019 recognised that the type specimen belonged to Daptocephalus.

See also
 List of therapsids

References

 The main groups of non-mammalian synapsids at Mikko's Phylogeny Archive

Dicynodonts
Permian synapsids of Africa
Fossil taxa described in 1934
Taxa named by Egbert Cornelis Nicolaas van Hoepen
Anomodont genera